Emily Toy (born c.1997) is an English professional golfer from Longdowns in Cornwall, winner of The Womens Amateur Championship in 2019.

Golf career
In July 2015, aged 17, Toy won the English Girls' Open Amateur Stroke Play Championship at Sheringham Golf Club. In January 2019, she toured Australia with England Golf, and won the 36-hole qualifier for the Women's New South Wales Amateur. In June 2019, she beat New Zealand's Amelia Garvey to win the Womens Amateur Championship at the Royal County Down Golf Club. In 2019, she played in the Evian Championship and the Women's British Open but missed the cut on both occasions.

Toy turn professional at the start of 2022.

Amateur wins
2015 English Girls' Open Amateur Stroke Play Championship
2017 R&A Foundation Scholars Tournament
2018 BUCS Golf Tour - English & Welsh Championships
2019 The Womens Amateur Championship

Source:

Team appearances
Amateur
Vagliano Trophy (representing Great Britain and Ireland): 2019
European Ladies' Team Championship (representing England): 2019, 2021 (winners)
Astor Trophy (representing Great Britain and Ireland): 2019
Curtis Cup (representing Great Britain & Ireland): 2021

Source:

References

External links

English female golfers
Winners of ladies' major amateur golf championships
Sportspeople from Cornwall
1997 births
Year of birth uncertain
Living people